The 2013–14 Washington Huskies women's basketball team will represent University of Washington during the 2013–14 NCAA Division I women's basketball season. The Huskies, led by first year head coach Mike Neighbors, play their home games at the Alaska Airlines Arena and were a members of the Pac-12 Conference. They finished the season with a record of 20–14 overall, 10–8 in Pac-12 play for a sixth-place finish. They lost in the first round in the 2014 Pac-12 Conference women's basketball tournament to Utah. They were invited to the 2014 Women's National Invitation Tournament which they defeated Hawaii in the first round, Oregon in the second round, San Diego in the third round before losing to UTEP in the quarterfinals.

Notable win
The team had a 12–10 record when they faced Stanford, then the #3 rated team in the country. The Cardinal were on a 62-game consecutive conference road winning streak. It was Neighbors' first game on national TV as the game was being broadcast by ESPNU. The Huskies decided to try to limit the inside game of Stanford, which was led by Chiney Ogwumike, the conference's leading scorer. Ogwumike scored 23 points, but with less than a minute left in the game, the Huskies held a twelve-point lead, 85–73. Washington missed free throws, while Stanford's Bonnie Samuelson hit a three pointer. She hit another one with nine seconds to go, and the margin was down to four points. The Huskies had the ball, but when they failed to inbound within five seconds, the ball turned over to Stanford. Ogwumike was fouled, and hit one free throw to cut the lead to three points. On the inbounds, Stanford almost stole the ball, but there was a tie-up and the possession arrow favored the Huskies. Washington was fouled on the ensuing play and hit two free throws to secure the victory over Stanford.

Roster

Schedule

|-
!colspan=9 style="background:#363c74; color:#e8d3a2;" | Exhibition

|-
!colspan=9 style="background:#363c74; color:#e8d3a2;" | Non-conference regular season

|-
!colspan=9 style="background:#363c74; color:#e8d3a2;" | Pac-12 regular season

|-
!colspan=9 style="background:#363c74;" | 2014 Pac-12 Conference Women's Tournament

|-
!colspan=9 style="background:#363c74;" | WNIT

Source

See also
2013–14 Washington Huskies men's basketball team

References

Washington Huskies women's basketball seasons
Washington
2014 Women's National Invitation Tournament participants
2013 in sports in Washington (state)
2014 in sports in Washington (state)